Boston Blackie Goes Hollywood is a 1942 American crime film, fourth of the fourteen Boston Blackie films of the 1940s Columbia's series of B pictures based on Jack Boyle's pulp-fiction character.

Plot summary

Boston Blackie (Chester Morris) and his sidekick The Runt (George E. Stone) are called, first to a Manhattan apartment where there's $60,000 waiting in a safe, then to Hollywood, by Boston's old friend Arthur Manleder (Lloyd Corrigan) to bail him out of gangster trouble. Naturally the police are suspicious and trail him every step of the way.

Cast 
 Chester Morris as Boston Blackie
 William Wright as Slick Barton
 Constance Worth as Gloria Lane
 Lloyd Corrigan as Arthur Manleder
 Richard Lane as Inspector John Farraday
 George E. Stone as The Runt
 Forrest Tucker as Whipper
 unbilled players include Lloyd Bridges, Ralph Dunn, Cy Kendall, Cyril Ring and Virginia Sale

References

External links 
 
 
 
 

1942 films
American black-and-white films
Columbia Pictures films
Films directed by Michael Gordon
American crime films
1942 crime films
Boston Blackie films
1940s American films